Erotic electrostimulation (abbreviated erotic e-stim and also known as electrosex) is a sexual practice involving the application of electrical stimulation to the nerves of the body, with particular emphasis on the genitals, using a power source (such as a TENS, EMS, violet wands, or made-for-play units) for purposes of sexual stimulation. Electrostimulation has been associated with BDSM activities, and erotic electrostimulation is an evolution of that practice.

Safety 
Electrostimulation, in general, can cause tissue damage or even death if misused. The most common problems arising from electrostimulation tend to be burns from lack of sufficiently wide surface contact, i.e. bad contact, between the electrode and the skin's surface. Even at relatively low current and voltage, there is also risk of interference with normal heart function (potentially including cardiac arrest), and this risk is higher for those who use an artificial pacemaker or similar device or who have heart conditions. Because of this, it is not advisable to place the electrical contacts in such a way that current passes through the chest cavity.

The international standard on the basic safety of medical nerve and muscle stimulators advises "that stimulation should not be applied across or through the head, directly on the eyes, covering the mouth, on the front of the neck, (especially the carotid sinus), or from electrodes placed on the chest and the upper back or crossing over the heart". The standard also notes that "any electrodes that have current densities exceeding 2 mA/cm² may require the special attention of the operator". It imposes the following limits on the output parameters of stimulators (for therapeutic purposes):

 with a load resistance of 500 Ω, the output current shall not exceed
80 mA at DC
50 mA below 400 Hz pulse frequency
80 mA at 400–1500 Hz
100 mA above 1500 Hz
 for pulse durations less than 0.1 s, the pulse energy into a 500 Ω load shall not exceed 300 mJ per pulse, for longer pulses the above DC limit applies
 the output shall not exceed a peak voltage of 500 V when measured under open-circuit condition

Erotic electrostimulation devices should avoid DC currents entirely, in order to avoid electrolytic effects. This is usually achieved through “biphasic” waveforms, in which each positive current pulse is followed by an equivalent negative current pulse. Devices with multiple channels (e.g. for several users or body regions) should have a small pulse isolation transformer for galvanic isolation in each channel, such that currents cannot flow across the body between channels. Pulse frequency, duration and amplitude should be selected to achieve the desired stimulation with the least amount of power delivered into the body, for example avoiding current during the refractory period after each action potential, where neurons do not respond to stimuli. Typical erotic electrostimulation devices use pulse frequencies in the range 300–3000 Hz, where skin nerves are most sensitive.

A few cases of accidental death as a result of autoerotic electrostimulation have been reported in the forensic science literature; the cases reported involved mains-powered, self-made devices, with current passing through the chest intentionally (usually via nipple stimulation) or unintentionally (for instance, touching an energized part with a hand). In one case reported in the press, a man from York, Pennsylvania was sentenced to 20–40 years in prison for third-degree murder and reckless endangerment after killing his wife with electrostimulation to her nipples directly from a power strip plugged into the mains.

History 

The use of electricity for entertainment purposes dates back at least as early as the 1740s. In the 1830s, insertable electrode attachments for small magnetos could be purchased. Later in the 1800s, various electric belts (some complete with "suspensory sack") were advertised as cures for impotence. In the 1920s, the American Medical Association investigated such devices, and concluded that they provided "more or less mechanical masturbation".

Modern electrostimulation first became recognized during the 1950s with the introduction of a device called the Relax-A-Cizor, which was originally designed to stimulate the muscles of a relaxing subject using electric currents as a means of "passive exercise". Such power sources are still in medical use today and are known as EMS (electrical muscle stimulation) units. Some people soon found alternative uses for the Relax-A-Cizors by placing the contacts on sexual parts of the body.

By the 1970s, medical TENS (transcutaneous electrical nerve stimulation) units were also being used for electrostimulation. In the 1980s the first devices manufactured specifically for erotic electrostimulation became available, in particular the Titillator and the Pleasure Box, later known as the PES Power Box.

In the 1970s, experimenters noticed that bare speaker wires could deliver a jolt and began using recorded and live sound for electrostimulation. At that time, there were no professionally made attachments for such play, so people built their own out of copper plumbing parts and other metal pieces with attention to resistors placed in series with the human parts to control the current for safety. Although early e-stim units used only a simple, pulsed, sinusoidal wave, newer units use more complex wave forms and also allow for the use of ambient sound or prerecorded wave forms like music or specially designed computer files for specific types of stimulation. There are now sites dedicated to the creation of MP3 files specifically for erotic journeys or symphonies, which can include such routines as rewards, punishments, very strong, and pleasantly soft portions.

Types of power sources

Medical power sources 

There are repackaged TENS and EMS units marketed as erotic electrostimulation power sources. EMS units are designed to cause muscle contraction.

Body toning and massage units 
An increasing number of "body toner" or "electromassage"-type power sources are being marketed directly to consumers. Though lacking in options compared to the more expensive specialized units, these have proven to be an inexpensive method for entry level practice.

Homemade power sources 
Some people craft "homemade" electrostimulation power sources, or adapt or modify commercial products (such as a Hifi or DVD system) that were never intended for electrostimulation of the human body. These can be dangerous practices; such improvised devices not specifically designed for use on the human body can easily cause injury. The risk is mostly twofold. First the device can supply too much power. Second the insulation of most devices is not suited for medical equipment. For example, a transient over-voltage on the mains input can damage the isolation of the transformer, resulting in the output terminals becoming live.

Erotic electrostimulation power sources 
Erotic electrostimulation power sources are specifically designed and manufactured for erotic use on the human body. The first analog devices became popular during the mid-1980s, and during the late 1990s digital devices also became available. Both types usually allow for adjustments of frequency and power output levels, some with complex preset "programs" and computer controls. The setups usually consist of a "box" and electrodes connected by wiring. Many of the boxes are portable and can be powered by batteries or come with built-in rechargeable batteries. Some units can be connected to remote operators via an Internet-connected computer or controlled via radio frequency key fobs. Units which can be powered by a 9 volt battery are preferable to those plugged into mains as they reduce the risk of accidental injury.

Other methods 
There are other medical methods that have led to patent filings, such as the discovery that placing electrodes in the spinal cord can induce pleasurable feelings leading to orgasm. There are also various apparatuses, with external or internal stimulation.

 U.S. patent 3,941,136: "Method for artificially inducing urination, defecation, or sexual excitation".
 U.S. patent 4,585,005: "Method and pacemaker for stimulating penile erection".

Other kinds of apparatus use interferential currents with four surface electrodes to replace the internal electrodes.

Electrodes
An electrode is used to deliver the actual electrostimulation to the body.

The image of the woman receiving electrostimulation shows a deprecated practice. Placing electrodes anywhere on the chest is risking current passing through the heart, which risks cardiac arrhythmia or arrest. The general rule for electrostimulation is 'only below the waist'.

For erotic electrostimulation, these are typically items designed to be applied to the genitals such as vaginal plugs and shields, anal plugs, probes to directly stimulate the prostate, testicle rings, CBT boards, cock rings, urethral probes, and other items for penile application. The pads used with TENS units are also used in the sexual application of electrostimulation. There are also electrified nipple and breast electrodes available, but while there is disagreement within the e-stim community about their safety the most commonly held consensus is 'only below the waist'.

The electrodes can be made of metals such as gold, silver, aluminum, and stainless steel. There are also electrodes made out of conductive silicone. Conductive rubber is a cheap, flexible and efficient option.

Violet wands

Violet wands were originally electric and neon testers, but are now split into two types: mechanical (Tesla Coil), and solid-state wands.  They are used for the application of low current, high voltage (min 35 kV to max 65 kV typically), high-frequency electricity to the body, as such they are most commonly used in BDSM for erotic sensation play.  Violet wands can deliver a variety of sharp, cutting, or piercing type sensations.

A violet wand typically consists of a hand-held "wand" made of plastic case which encases the mechanical (Tesla coil) or solid state components; a power cable, a collet (7/16" in the United States, 11 mm in Europe), and a cone. The collet is inside the cone end of the violet wand and is where glass and metal probes are inserted to be used with the wand. The cone is there to prevent sparks jumping from the collet directly to subject. Violet wands can be used anywhere on the body but should not be used around the eyes.

Lubrication 
Electroconductive gels play an important role in the success of erotic electrostimulation since without it, there is a greater risk of high-current skin burning. Water-based lubricants are generally recommended. Typically it is recommended to avoid any lubricant that contains silicone since it is an insulator and hence reduces conductivity. Practitioners of electrostimulation select lubricants for compatibility with the material of the electrodes, as well as for desirable conductive properties, which can maximize the strength and quality of the signal.

See also 

Edgeplay
 Electroejaculation
 Electrodiagnostic medicine

References 

BDSM activities
Sexual acts
Sexual fetishism
Masturbation
Sex toys